Wisdom Hills is a cluster of summits which rise to 2,000 m and form the northwest segment of Molar Massif in the Bowers Mountains. Named in 1983 by the New Zealand Antarctic Place-Names Committee (NZ-APC), on a proposal from geologist M.G. Laird, in association with the name Molar Massif.

Hills of Victoria Land
Pennell Coast